Robert Ray Djokovich (born August 10, 1956) is an American former Basketball and Handball player who competed in the 1984 Summer Olympics in handball. He was the 6th President of the USA Team Handball. He was born in Gary, Indiana.

Career as College player
He was between 1977–78 co-captain at the basketball team of the United States Air Force Academy which he played from 1974 to 1978.

In 1976 he and Thomas Schneeberger started a handball club at the USAFA and won the handball nationals six times.

Career as National player
Between 1977 and 1987 he was national player at the United States men's national handball team. At the Summer Olympics in 1984 was he team captain and scored 18 goals. He's biggest victories are the Gold medal at the Pan American Games in 1987 and a silver medal at the Goodwill Games in 1986.

Career as USA Team Handball staff
He was the 6th president of the US Team Handball Federation between 2001 and 2004, simultaneous he was a member of the United States Olympic Committee Board of Directors.

References

1956 births
Living people
Air Force Falcons men's basketball players
Air Force Falcons team handball
American male handball players
American men's basketball players
American people of Serbian descent
Basketball players from Gary, Indiana
Goodwill Games medalists in handball
Handball players at the 1984 Summer Olympics
Handball players at the 1987 Pan American Games
Olympic handball players of the United States
Pan American Games gold medalists for the United States
Pan American Games medalists in handball
Point guards
Sportspeople from Gary, Indiana
Competitors at the 1986 Goodwill Games
Medalists at the 1987 Pan American Games